Marie-Françoise Leclère (20 April 1942 – 27 April 2021) was a French journalist at Elle and Le Point. She was also the co-writer of José Pinheiro's film, released on 12 October 1983. She was jury at the 1994 Cannes Film Festival.

Leclère first started being involved in journalism after becoming an assistant editor at Elle after being introduced to the position by Hélène Lazareff. The later went onto join Le Point in the 1970's and later bcame editor-in-chief for the department covering culture by 2007.

She was the wife of Lucien Bodard. Leclère died in April 2021, aged 79, from cancer.

References

20th-century French journalists
French women journalists
1942 births
2021 deaths
Year of birth uncertain
Place of birth missing
Place of death missing
Deaths from cancer
20th-century French women